Yugesh Kushwaha (born 6 July 1990; sometimes billed as Yogi) is an Indian actor and singer who predominantly appears in Kannada films.

Yogesh made his debut in the 2007 film Duniya  where he portrayed the supporting character named "Loose Maada" and since then being referred with the same name. However, the success of A. P. Arjun's directorial debut film Ambari (2009), which earned him a Karnataka State Film Award for Best Actor, started Yogesh's successful career as an actor. He has featured in several successful films such as Hudugaru (2011), Sidlingu (2012), Alemari (2012) and Yaare Koogadali (2012). Besides films, he has appeared in the television dance talent show Thaka Dhimi Tha Dancing star as a judge.

Personal life 
Yogesh is the son of producer TP Siddaraju. He married his longtime girlfriend Sahitya on November 2, 2017, in Bangalore. They have a daughter Shrinika.

Filmography

Films

Television

References

External links 
 

Living people
Male actors in Kannada cinema
Indian male film actors
Indian male playback singers
Male actors from Bangalore
Kannada playback singers
21st-century Indian male actors
Participants in Indian reality television series
1990 births